The ITF Women's Circuit – Xuzhou was a tournament for professional female tennis players played on outdoor hard courts. The event was classified as a $50,000 ITF Women's Circuit tournament and was held in Xuzhou, China, in 2015.

Past finals

Singles

Doubles

External links 
 ITF search 

ITF Women's World Tennis Tour
Hard court tennis tournaments
Tennis tournaments in China
2015 establishments in China
Xuzhou
Sport in Jiangsu